Los Monsters is the eighth studio album by Elvis Crespo. It was released on May 1, 2012 and was nominated for Tropical Album of the Year at the Premio Lo Nuestro 2013.

Track listing
"Rico Miedo"
"Vallenato En Karaoke" (feat. Maffio)
"Conmigo y Contigo" (feat. El Cata)
"Yo No Soy Un Monstruo" (feat. Ilegales)
"Por Un Minuto de Tu Amor" (feat. Joseph Fonseca)
"Bajo El Arbol" (feat. Angel & Khriz)
"Zombie" (feat. El Cata)
"Te Invito Un Café"
"La Novia Bella" (feat. Gocho)
"Vallenato En Karaoke" (feat. Los del Puente)
"Vallenato En Karaoke" (merengue version)
"Nuestra Canción" (feat. Jorge Celedón)

Charts

References

Elvis Crespo albums
2012 albums